Darin (also Romanized as Darīn and Dārīn) is a village in, and the capital of, Surk Rural District of Bafruiyeh District of Meybod County, Yazd province, Iran. At the 2006 National Census, its population was 127 in 36 households. The following census in 2011 counted 169 people in 51 households. The latest census in 2016 showed a population of 150 people in 45 households.

References 

Meybod County

Populated places in Yazd Province

Populated places in Meybod County